Kirill Leonovich Safonov (born 21 June 1973, in the village Ermakovskoe, Krasnoyarsk Krai, RSFSR, USSR) is a Russian film and theater actor.

Biography
Kirill Safonov was born on 21 June 1973 in the East Siberian village Ermakovskoe, Krasnoyarsk region.  Mother — Galina Semenovna, a teacher of Russian language and literature, currently resides in Ashkelon (Israel). Kirill has two older sisters.

Safonov spent his childhood years in the Krasnoyarsk region. He went to school in Lviv, Ukraine, where his family moved. Thanks to his mother, who worked as a Director of the Lviv House of Pioneers, he attended various workshops and read poetry at concerts. When he was 12 years old, his parents divorced. To help his mother, who had to raise three children on her own, Kirill worked in construction brigades while being in high school.

Kirill wanted to become an actor since childhood. One of his first roles was the role of the mayor in the school play. After high school, he applied to the faculty of directing in the Cultural Institute of the city of Rivne. Successfully passing the creative rounds, he  flunked out  on the Ukrainian language test. After the failure with the theatrical institution, Kirill got a job as a seller of paintings in an art exhibition, and painted paintings for sale.

In the early 1990s, Kirill Safonov married to Elena and moved back to Krasnoyarsk, where his family moved back earlier.

In 1993, he enrolled in the theater faculty of the Krasnoyarsk Institute of Arts. After completing the first course, Kirill successfully passed the audition and was transferred to the second course of GITIS (Russian Academy of Theatre Arts), workshop of Andrey Goncharov. In 1997, the young actor was expelled from the fourth year of the Institute.

As a student of GITIS, Kiriill participated in performances of the Theatre of Mayakovsky, which was led by Goncharov. He played the main roles in  Children of Vanyushin  and The Waltz of the Dogs.

After a falling-out with Goncharov, Safonov moved to the Theater of Stanislavsky, where he participated in productions directed by Vladimir Mirzoev, The Taming of the Shrew and  Twelfth Night.  In parallel with his work in the theater, the artist was forced to work as a cab driver in order to support his family.

In 1999, following a recommendation by the actor Leonid Kanevsky, the actor was invited to  Gesher  theater in Israel. He left Russia with his wife Elena and their daughter Anastasia(who was born in 1995), where his mother and sisters, with their families, already lived. Having mastered Hebrew in two months, Kirill played roles in the plays  Sea  based on Carlo Goldoni’s  Brawling in Chioggia,  The Devil in Moscow  based on Mikhail Bulgakov's The Master and Margarita and  Mademoiselle Julie  by Swedish playwright August Strindberg.

In 2001, Kirill Safonov divorced his wife Elena. Maintaining friendly relations.

A turning point in his career came in 2006. As an already well-known Israeli artist, Safonov came to the Moscow film festival, in a competitive program which included the film  Half-Russian Story  in which he played one of the leading roles.

During his life in Israel, Kirill starred in films like  Dust  (2000),  This Evening: The Survivor  (2002),   The Bird Doesn’t Mind  (2003),  Under the Sign of "Venus" (2004),  Half-Russian Story (2006), and others.

Kirill Safonov:  I didn't leave Russia permanently, but I wanted to return as a winner, not as a looser. Representing the Israeli film  Half-Russian Story, being an Israeli actor, meant victory to me. I decided for myself: wherever I’ll be offered a good job, there I will stay.

After some time, the actor was invited to play the leading role in the TV series  Tatiana's Day, after the release of which in 2007, Safonov became incredibly popular in Russia. According to results of the annual  7D  rating for 2007, he became the winner of  Opening of the Year  nomination, for his role as Sergei in  Tatiana's Day.

In 2008, Safonov, in duet with Anna Snatkina, recorded the song  Two Loves, which was included in the soundtrack of the TV series  Tatyana's Day.

The actor has played in theatrical enterprise plays  The Postman Always Rings Twice  and  The Glass Menagerie / Blue Rose.

On 17 April 2010, Kirill Safonov married singer Sasha Savelyeva, after they met in 2009 at a nightclub. The wedding ceremony was held in the Tsaritsyno estate

The actor also wrote poetry, enjoys singing (recorded a solo album  Dreams of Gulliver), painting (his works sold at art exhibitions), photography, and outdoor activities

In addition to Russian citizenship, Kirill Safonov has Israeli citizenship. Currently, the actor lives in Moscow. In recent years, he is in high demand as a theater actor.

On 26 June 2016, Kirill Safonov presented his debut film  The Fourth, in the competition of short films at the Moscow International Film Festival.

Later this year, at the Golden Phoenix Film Festival for his short film  The Fourth, Kirill Safonov received the  Ruby Phoenix  Debut Prize named after Yuri Gagarin.

Personal life
His first wife  — Elena. The marriage lasted from 1991 to 2001. After the divorce, the former spouses have kept friendly relations.
Daughter  — Anastasia (born 1995), lives with her mother in Israel.
Second wife  — Alexandra Savelieva, Russian singer, soloist of the pop group Fabrika. Since 2010. 27 March 2019 the couple had a son.

Selected filmography
 2000 Dust as episode
  2002 This Evening: The Survivor as Andzhej Rubinshtejn 
  2003 The Bird Doesn't Mind as episode
  2006 Half-Russian Story as Roman
 2006 Bad Girls | Yeladot Ra'ot   as episode
 2007 Apocalypse Code as FSB operative
 2007 Vera’s Crisis as Anton 
 2007 Thank You For Your Love as Lyonya
 2007-2008 Tatiana’s Day as Sergei Nikiforov 
 2008 My Autumn Blues as Maksim
 2009 Backwater District as Dmitry Zorin 
 2011 How I Met Your Mother as Vlad, Alina’s rich lover
 2011 Bablo as Grigory, businessman
 2012 Brief Guide To A Happy Life (TV) as Pyotr Alekseevich Shirokov 
 2013 Terms of Contract-2 as Oleg Arhipov 
 2013 Bad Blood as Fyodor Alekseevich Kostomarov 
 2014 Good Hands as Sergej Vladimirovich Ruzhnikov 
 2014 Smile of a Mockingbird as Kirill Valentinovich Kruchinin 
 2015 The New Wife as Gosha 
 2016 Penal  as Captain Ignat Belov

References

External links
 
 Официальный сайт Кирилла Сафонова // safonov.tv
 

1973 births
Living people
People from Krasnoyarsk Krai
Russian Jews
Russian emigrants to Israel
Russian male film actors
Russian male stage actors
Russian male television actors
21st-century Russian male actors
Israeli male stage actors
Israeli male film actors
Israeli male television actors
21st-century Israeli male actors
Russian Academy of Theatre Arts alumni